Linton Chapel is a ruined chapel on the east coast of Shapinsay, Orkney (Grid Reference HY5218). The chapel is thought to date as early as the 12th century AD.   Slightly to the south is a megalithic monument, Castle Bloody.

See also
Mor Stein

References

Churches in Orkney
Archaeological sites in Orkney
Shapinsay
Scheduled monuments in Scotland